Petrenko is a patronymic surname of Slavic origin derived from the first name Petro (the Ukrainian equivalent of Peter) and effectively means of Peter/Peter's. Notable people with the surname include:

Arts and music
Alexei Petrenko (1938–2017), Soviet actor
Igor Petrenko (born 1977), Russian actor
Kirill Petrenko (born 1972), Russian conductor, General Music Director of Bavarian State Opera
Mikhail Petrenko (born 1976), Russian opera singer
Roman Petrenko (born 1964), Russian media executive
Vasily Petrenko (born 1976), Russian conductor, Chief Conductor of the Royal Liverpool Philharmonic and Oslo Philharmonic

Sports
Aleksandr Petrenko (born 1983), Russian triple jumper
Alexander Petrenko (1976–2006), Russian basketball player
Dmitri Petrenko (born 1966), Soviet/Russian football player and coach
Ihor Petrenko (born 1938), Soviet/Ukrainian pole vaulter
Iryna Petrenko (born 1992), Ukrainian biathlete
Jared Petrenko (born 1989), Australian football player of Ukrainian descent
Serhei Petrenko (born 1956), Soviet/Ukrainian canoeist
Sergei Petrenko (footballer) (born 1955), Soviet/Russian football player and coach
Sergei Petrenko (born 1968), Soviet/Ukrainian ice hockey player
Viktor Petrenko (born 1969), Soviet/Ukrainian World and Olympic champion in figure skating
Vladimir Petrenko (born 1971), Soviet/Ukrainian figure skater

Other
Anatol Petrencu, Moldovan historian and politician
Dimitri Petrenko, player character in Call of Duty: World at War
János Petrenkó (1940–2020), Hungarian industrialist, inventor and politician
Petro Petrenko (1890–1921), Ukrainian military commander

See also
 

Ukrainian-language surnames
Surnames of Ukrainian origin
Patronymic surnames
Surnames from given names